RNCHAMPS (pronounced "R, N, champs") is a mnemonic acronym used to recall the types of shock.  The mnemonic is alternately known as CRAMPS NH ("Cramps, New Hampshire") or NH-CRAMPS ("New Hampshire cramps").  Its utility in distinguishing types of shock has been discussed in medical literature and reference material concerning emergency medicine, emergency medical services, fire rescue, and specialized courses such as the Comprehensive Advanced Life Support Program.

The acronym

Alternatives
The Comprehensive Advanced Life Support (CALS) Program uses a slightly different acronym called "SHRIMPCAN."  This acronym adds the letter "I", which stands for "Ingestions" (drug overdoses).  The remainder of the letters in the acronym stand for the same components as the RNCHAMPS mnemonic.

References

Medical mnemonics
Mnemonic acronyms